Kunming Metro, or Kunming Rail Transit, is a rapid transit system in Kunming, the capital of Yunnan Province.  With a population of just over 3 million people, Kunming was one of the largest cities in China without a metro system before its construction. The system currently consists of 6 lines.

Background
The streets of Kunming have long been congested, and as such there have been talks of a subway system since the late 1990s. A 2006 proposal would have seen construction start in 2008 with a north-south line and an east-west line. The current rapid transit system was first announced in 2009, with construction scheduled to start later that year.  The proposed routes would not only serve commuters in Kunming city centre, but would help encourage development to the city's southeast. The suburb of Chenggong has been the site of a recent construction boom, although most new developments were still unoccupied without adequate transit connections. Thus, the Kunming Metro served the dual purpose of alleviating traffic problems in the city's core and encouraging growth in the southeast.

Construction on Lines 1 and 2 officially began in May 2010, after months of delays. An elevated test section had been under construction since 2009. Lines 1 (34 km) and 2 (22 km) were scheduled to open in 2012, but with delays, weren't opened until early 2013. Construction on Line 3 began in August 2010 and was opened on 29 August 2017.

Construction of Line 1 is expected to cost as much as 32 billion yuan (US$4.5 billion), with each kilometer of elevated metro costing around 250 million yuan and each kilometer of underground subway expected to cost between 400 million and 800 million yuan. The primary contractor is China Railway Construction Corporation (CRCC).

Rolling stock
Line 6:
The trains were manufactured by China South Locomotive & Rolling Stock Corporation Ltd (CSR) in Zhuzhou. 6-car sets operate at 120 km/h. CSR met journalists in October 2011 to discuss the safety concerns arising from operating trains at such speeds.

Lines

Operational

Line 1 & Line 2

Line 1 & 2 is currently 40.4 km long with 31 stations, running from North Coach Station to University Town (South). The first phase for Line 1 came into operation on May 20, 2013. On April 30, 2014 the second phase of Line 1 and the first phase of Line 2 came into operation. It consists of underground segments in Central Kunming and Chenggong and an elevated segment connecting the two. Attractions served include Kunming railway station, Century Town, Guandu Old Town, and Sports Centre. A 5.3 km long branch line to Kunming South railway station was opened on 26 December 2016. Line 1/2 will be split into two operational lines once Line 1 Northwestern extension and Line 2 Phase 2 are completed, and then South Ring Road station will become an interchange station. Line 1's color is red, while Line 2's color is blue.

Line 3

Line 3 started operation on 29 Aug 2017, consisting 19.16 km of line with 20 stations running from Western Hills Park to East Coach Station through the centre of Kunming. Line 3's color is magenta.

Line 4

Line 4's color is orange.

Line 5

Line 5 started operation on 29 June 2022. Line 5's color is green.

Line 6

Line 6 (from west to east): 25.3 km, 8 stations, Phase 1 opened on 28 June 2012 as an express line connecting the other lines of the system with the new Kunming Changshui International Airport.  The two intermediate stations between East Coach Station and Kunming Airport were not open at first. Line 6 temporary ceased operation on 5 March 2016 to complete the two infill stations and finally reentered operation on 29 August 2017 with total of four stations. Phase 2 of Line 6 opened on 23 September 2020. Line 6's color is teal.

Under construction

Line 9, the Songming-Anning Inter-city Rail Line and the extensions of Lines 1 and 2 are under construction. All station names that are included in phase 1 have been confirmed.

See also
 List of rapid transit systems

Notes

References

Sources 
news.kunming.cn
yn.xinhuanet.com

External links
Kunming Metro Official Website
UrbanRail page on Kunming Metro

 
Rapid transit in China
Railway lines opened in 2012
2012 establishments in China